Pier Antonio Bernabei (1570–1630) was an Italian painter also known as Della Casa.

Biography

A native of Parma, Pier Antonio Bernabei was a follower of the style of Correggio. Among his best-known works is a frescoed view of Paradise on the cupola of Santa Maria del Quartiere in Parma. Another renowned fresco is the Assumption for a chapel at the church of San Martino at Traversetolo. There are other works by this master at the Carmelites, and at the sacristy of the church of San Quintino, Parma. His younger brothers, Francesco and Alessandro Bernabei were also painters.

References

16th-century Italian painters
Italian male painters
17th-century Italian painters
Painters from Parma
Italian Renaissance painters
1570 births
1630 deaths
Place of death unknown